The Enemy Chorus is the second album by The Earlies, released in 2007.

Reception

The Enemy Chorus received positive reviews from critics, although not as favorable compared to their debut album. On Metacritic, the album holds a score of 67/100 based on 23 reviews, indicating "generally favorable reviews."

Track listing
"No Love In Your Heart" – 4:53
"Burn The Liars" – 2:44
"Enemy Chorus" – 4:12
"The Ground We Walk On" – 4:31
"Bad Is As Bad Does" – 5:46
"Gone For The Most Part" – 4:13
"Foundation And Earth" – 5:26
"Little Trooper" – 4:40
"Broken Chain" – 3:17
"When The Wind Blows" – 4:02
"Breaking Point" – 5:23

References

2007 albums
The Earlies albums
Secretly Canadian albums